Aaron Cove (sometimes called Aaron's Cove) is the name of a bay and former community in Labrador in the province of Newfoundland and Labrador, Canada.

See also 
List of ghost towns in Newfoundland and Labrador

References 

Bays of Newfoundland and Labrador
Ghost towns in Newfoundland and Labrador
Coves of Canada